Plouvorn is a commune in the Finistère department of Brittany in north-western France.

Population
Inhabitants of Plouvorn are called in French Plouvornéens.

Breton language
In 2008, 9.92% of primary-school children attended bilingual schools, where Breton language is taught alongside French.

See also
Communes of the Finistère department
List of the works of the Maître de Plougastel

References

External links

Official website 

Mayors of Finistère Association 

Communes of Finistère